Greenhill Lower railway station served the village of Greenhill, Falkirk, Scotland from 1848 to 1966 on the Scottish Central Railway.

History 
The station opened on 1 March 1848 by the Caledonian Railway. A third platform was added when the Bonnybridge Branch opened. The platform opened on the north side, making the former northern platform an island platform. It was also known as Greenhill Junction in some Caledonian timetables. The station closed on 18 April 1966.

References

External links 
RAILSCOT - Greenhill Lower 

Disused railway stations in Falkirk (council area)
Railway stations in Great Britain opened in 1848
Railway stations in Great Britain closed in 1966
Former Caledonian Railway stations
1848 establishments in Scotland
1966 disestablishments in Scotland
Beeching closures in Scotland